Resurrection from the dead (or similar terms) may refer to:

 Resurrection, the coming back to life after death
 Universal resurrection, the final resurrection at the end time
 Resurrection of Jesus, the Christian belief
 The resurrection of the undead, in various religions and in popular culture